Septien is a 2011 independent film directed by and starring Michael Tully. The film also stars Onur Tukel, Robert Longstreet, and Rachel Korine. Its narrative concerns the return of bearded athlete Cornelius Rawlings to his family's Tennessee farm eighteen years after he disappeared, and the strange new life he forms with his brothers Ezra and Amos.

Cast

Michael Tully as Cornelius Rawlings 
Onur Tukel as Amos Rawlings 
Robert Longstreet as Ezra Rawlings 
Rachel Korine as Savannah

Release
Septien was premiered at the 2011 Sundance Film Festival, and subsequently screened within such festivals as BAFICI, International Film Festival Rotterdam, South by Southwest, Sarasota Film Festival, and Maryland Film Festival.

It was acquired for distribution by IFC Films.

Reception
The film holds a 56% rating on the review aggregator Rotten Tomatoes.

References

External links
 
 
 

American independent films
2011 films
2010s English-language films
2010s American films